Building 429 is an American Christian rock band.

Building 429 may also refer to:
Building 429 (2000 album), by the rock band Building 429
Building 429 (2008 album), by the rock band Building 429